This is intended to be a complete list of properties and districts listed on the National Register of Historic Places in Rochester, New York, United States. The locations of National Register properties and districts (at least for all showing latitude and longitude coordinates below) may be seen in an online map by clicking on "Map of all coordinates".

There are 218 properties and districts listed on the National Register in Monroe County, including three National Historic Landmarks. The city of Rochester includes 117 of these properties and districts, including all National Historic Landmarks; they are listed here, while the remaining properties and districts are listed separately. One property, the New York State Barge Canal, a National Historic Landmark District spans both the city and the remainder of the county. Another property in Rochester was formerly listed and has been removed.

Current listings

 

|}

Former listing

|}

See also
National Register of Historic Places listings in New York

References 

Rochester